AFL Insider is an Australian AFL talk show that deals with the issues in the AFL. It airs on Fox Sports on 6 July 2010, beginning at  later moves to Fox Footy.

Hosts
Jason Dunstall
Alastair Lynch

See also

 List of Australian television series
 List of longest-running Australian television series

References

External links

Fox Sports (Australian TV network) original programming
Fox Footy original programming
2010 Australian television series debuts
Australian rules football television series